Zygmunt Grudziński may refer to:
 Zygmunt Grudziński (1560–1618), Polish nobleman, voivode (ruler) of Rawa
 Zygmunt Grudziński (1568–1653), Polish nobleman, voivode of Innowrocław and Kalisz
 Zygmunt Grudziński (1870–1929), Polish radiologist